Louisburg Historic District is a national historic district located at Louisburg, Franklin County, North Carolina.   The district encompasses 206 contributing buildings, 1 contributing site, 6 contributing structures, and 1 contributing object in residential sections of Louisburg included in the original 1779 town plan.  It also includes a section of Louisburg College located on the old Town Commons.  Dwellings date between about 1800 and the 1920s and include notable examples of popular architectural styles including Federal / Georgian, Italianate / Greek Revival, Queen Anne, Colonial Revival, Late Victorian, and Bungalow / American Craftsman.  Located in the district and separately listed are the Fuller House, Williamson House, and Main Building, Louisburg College.  Other notable buildings include the Shine-King House (c. 1800), Milner-Perry-Boddie-Dennis House (c. 1779), Dr. J.B. Clifton House (c. 1865), The Edgerton-Pruitt House (c. 1905), The Furgurson-Hicks House (c. 1908), Nicholson-Bickett-Taylor House (c. 1897), The Hughes-Watson-Wheless House (c. 1900), Bailey-Yarborough House (c. 1895), The Barrow House (c. 1888–1890), The Neal-Webb House (c. 1904), The Milner-Williams-Person Place (c. 1789–1830), Former Rectory-St. Paul's Episcopal Church, Hicks-Perry-Bland-Holmes House (c. 1914), Malcomb McKinne House (c. 1922) First Baptist Church (1927), Louisburg United Methodist Church (1900), and Louisburg Baptist Church (1901-1904).

It was listed on the National Register of Historic Places in 1987.

References

Historic districts on the National Register of Historic Places in North Carolina
Greek Revival architecture in North Carolina
Federal architecture in North Carolina
Victorian architecture in North Carolina
Colonial Revival architecture in North Carolina
Buildings and structures in Franklin County, North Carolina
National Register of Historic Places in Franklin County, North Carolina